The Herbert von Karajan Prize was endowed by Eliette von Karajan in 2015 and first awarded in 2017 within the frame of the Salzburg Easter Festival. The prize is endowed with €50,000 and is presented by Eliette von Karajan annually.

Recipients
 2017 Daniil Trifonov
 2018 Sol Gabetta
 2019 Mariss Jansons
 2020 Janine Jansen
 2021 Hilary Hahn
 2022 Staatskapelle Dresden

References

External links
  

Austrian music awards
Classical music awards
Awards established in 2015
Herbert von Karajan